The Elgin, Joliet and Eastern Railway  was a Class I railroad, operating between Waukegan, Illinois and Gary, Indiana. The railroad served as a link between Class I railroads traveling to and from Chicago, although it operated almost entirely within the city's suburbs, and only entered Chicago where it served the U.S. Steel South Works on the shores of Lake Michigan. Nicknames for the railroad included "The J" and "The Chicago Outer Belt Line". At the end of 1970, the EJ&E operated 164 miles of track and carried 848 million ton-miles of revenue freight in that year alone.

On September 26, 2007, the Canadian National Railway announced that it planned to purchase a majority of the EJ&E, leaving a portion of the line in Indiana to be reorganized as the Gary Railway. The purchase was approved on December 24, 2008, by the U.S. Surface Transportation Board, and the deal was consummated effective February 1, 2009. In the years immediately following the merger, the railroad existed as a subsidiary of Canadian National, and EJ&E locomotives that were repainted into CN colors were sub-lettered for the EJ&E.

On December 31, 2012, Canadian National announced that the merger of the EJ&E into Wisconsin Central Ltd. (Another railroad subsidiary of CN) had been completed, and would take effect the following day. On January 1, 2013, the EJ&E effectively ceased to exist, 124 years to the day it was founded.

History

The Elgin, Joliet and Eastern was created when several local railroads in Illinois and Indiana merged throughout the end of the 19th century.  The systems that would make up the EJ&E included the Joliet, Aurora & Northern Railway (which dates back to 1884) and Elgin, Joliet & Eastern Railway Company of Illinois.  The Elgin, Joliet and Eastern Railway began operations on December 4, 1888, through the merger of these two systems.  After the creation of the modern day EJ&E the railroad expanded by purchasing several other smaller lines including the Waukegan & Southwestern Railway; Gardner, Coal City & Northern Railway; Western Indiana Railroad; and the Chicago, Lake Shore & Eastern Railway.

The EJ&E moved to serve industries in the Hammond-East Chicago-Whiting industrial district by acquiring trackage rights in 1894. However, construction of the present line to Gary, Whiting and South Chicago was initiated in 1899 by the Griffith and Northern Railway. Connections with the Chicago, Lake Shore and Eastern Railway and the Western Indiana Railway further penetrated the district, although the EJ&E subsequently acquired both lines. In 1898 the EJ&E merged with four other non-railway companies to form Federal Steel Company. In 1901, United States Steel Corporation was formed from a merger that included Federal Steel, and U.S. Steel thereby acquired the railroad.

The railroad's passenger services began with the start of operations in January 1889. The railroad stopped operating passenger trains in 1907, but continued passenger service until 1909. During those two years, passengers would be transported by caboose.

The EJ&E underwent dieselization relatively early. In 1937, the railroad acquired its first diesel-electric locomotive, an EMC SW switcher, which was designated EJ&E #200. Over the next 12 years, the entire steam fleet was replaced with first generation diesels. The first road diesel, Baldwin DT-6-6-2000 #100, was delivered to the railroad in May 1946. The final steam movement occurred in late May 1949, led by a Mikado 2-8-2, EJ&E #740. The locomotive was sold to the scrapper that September. Another 2-8-2, #765, which had been sold to the Duluth, Missabe and Iron Range Railway in 1948, is the railway's only surviving steam locomotive. It was donated to Gary, Indiana in 1962 and has been on static display in Lakefront Park, next to I-90 and the South Shore Line's Gary station ever since. The Illinois Railway Museum attempted to purchase the engine in the early 1980s, but Gary refused this offer.

In 1988, United States Steel and the Blackstone Group formed Transtar Inc. to serve as a shareholder of the EJ&E and several other affiliated railroads and companies. In March 2001, the Blackstone Group ended their ownership interest in Transtar, resulting in its becoming a fully owned subsidiary of United States Steel.

On May 16, 2006, the EJ&E was the recipient of the 2005 Bronze E. H. Harriman Award for employee safety in group C (line-haul railroads with less than 4 million employee hours per year).

Canadian National/Gary Railway

On September 10, 2007, Crain's Chicago Business reported that the Canadian National Railway was in talks to purchase the EJ&E. In 2004, Canadian National had acquired two railroads, the Duluth, Missabe and Iron Range Railroad and the Bessemer and Lake Erie Railroad, that had also previously been owned by Transtar, but that at the time CN acquired them were owned by Great Lakes Transportation, LLC, a Blackstone Group subsidiary created when USS became the sole owner of Transtar).  The purchase agreement was officially announced on September 26; CN would purchase the majority of the line.  The purchase was initially expected to close in mid-2008, valued at $300 million.

In fact, the closing did not take place until January 31, 2009 (effective February 1, 2009), following regulatory approval of the purchase by the Surface Transportation Board on December 24, 2008. Canadian National plans to use the EJ&E to route trains around Chicago, where they now face lengthy delays because of congestion in the busy rail hub.

In accordance with its agreement with CN, Transtar retained some railroad infrastructure in Gary, Indiana; this infrastructure has been reorganized as the Gary Railway to continue serving U.S. Steel's plants located there.

On Tuesday, March 10, 2009, the first two Canadian National trains debuted on the Elgin, Joliet, & Eastern, with plans to run six trains per day on the lines in the near future.

Motive power

All-time diesel roster
The EJ&E's all time diesel roster consisted of:

Locomotive designations in bold indicate that these models were on the roster at the time of the railroad's sale to the Canadian National Railway.

Communities
The EJ&E connects the following cities and large towns:
 Waukegan, Illinois
 Libertyville, Illinois
 Vernon Hills, Illinois
 Lake Zurich, Illinois
 Barrington, Illinois
 Hoffman Estates, Illinois
 Elgin, Illinois
 West Chicago, Illinois
 Aurora, Illinois
 Plainfield, Illinois
 Joliet, Illinois
 Minooka, Illinois
 Morris, Illinois
 New Lenox, Illinois
 Mokena, Illinois
 Frankfort, Illinois
 Richton Park, Illinois
 Chicago Heights, Illinois
 Park Forest, Illinois
 Griffith, Indiana
 Gary, Indiana

See also

 Belt Railway Company of Chicago
 Indiana Harbor Belt Railroad
 Gary Railway

References

External links

 Elgin, Joliet and Eastern Railway
 Elgin, Joliet & Eastern Railway Archive
 Shortlines of Chicago Historical Society: EJ&E history

Regional railroads in the United States
Defunct Illinois railroads
Defunct Indiana railroads
Transportation in Gary, Indiana
Railroads in the Chicago metropolitan area
Grundy County, Illinois
Lake County, Indiana
1889 establishments in Illinois
Former Class I railroads in the United States
Railway companies established in 1889
Canadian National Railway
Defunct Wisconsin railroads
Transportation in Lake County, Illinois
Transportation in Will County, Illinois
Transportation in Cook County, Illinois
Transportation in DuPage County, Illinois
1889 establishments in Indiana
1898 mergers and acquisitions
2013 disestablishments in Illinois